John Ekiru Kelai (born 29 December 1976) is a male long-distance runner from Kenya, who specialises in the marathon. He set his personal best of 2:09:09 hours for the distance at the 2005 edition of the Eindhoven Marathon, where he finished fourth. He is a two-time winner of the Enschede Marathon, also in the Netherlands, and had consecutive wins at the Mumbai Marathon in 2007–2008.

Biography
Kelai won the 2003 Singapore Marathon, the 2004 Brussels Marathon, and was the 2007 winner of the Toronto Waterfront Marathon. In 2009 he was third at the Mumbai Marathon, failing to defend his title, and took fourth at both the Singapore and Karstadt Marathons.

He was selected for the marathon at the 2010 Commonwealth Games and he moved away from the field in the final 10 km to become Commonwealth champion (only the second Kenyan man to take the title after Douglas Wakiihuri). "I am so humbled to win here. It is an honour. I didn't know I could be the winner", said Kelai, "I feel on top of the world". He stayed on in Asia for 2011, coming sixth at the Mumbai Marathon and third in Singapore.

He was invited to the 2012 Brighton Marathon and was third in a Kenyan podium sweep.

Achievements

References

External links

1976 births
Living people
Kenyan male long-distance runners
Kenyan male marathon runners
Commonwealth Games gold medallists for Kenya
Athletes (track and field) at the 2010 Commonwealth Games
Athletes (track and field) at the 2014 Commonwealth Games
Commonwealth Games medallists in athletics
20th-century Kenyan people
21st-century Kenyan people
Medallists at the 2010 Commonwealth Games